QSL may refer to:
Q code acknowledgement of receipt of radio message
QSL card,  acknowledging receipt
Qatar Stars League, the premier association football league in Qatar
 Quebec Sign Language
Queensland State League, a defunct soccer league in Australia